Tetrachloride may refer to:

Carbon tetrachloride, CCl4, also known as carbon tet
Germanium tetrachloride, GeCl4, a colourless liquid used as an intermediate in the production of purified germanium metal
Molybdenum tetrachloride, MoCl4
Selenium tetrachloride, SeCl4
Silicon tetrachloride, SiCl4
Tellurium tetrachloride, TeCl4
Titanium tetrachloride, TiCl4
Uranium tetrachloride, UCl4, a dark green compound of uranium
Vanadium tetrachloride, VCl4, a bright red liquid and starting reagent in the preparation of vanadium compounds
Zirconium tetrachloride, ZrCl4, an intermediate in the conversion of zirconium minerals to metallic zirconium by the Kroll process.
Lead tetrachloride, PbCl4
Tin(IV) chloride, SnCl4, also known as tin tetrachloride or stannic chloride.